This is a list of diplomatic missions in South Korea. There are currently 115 embassies and five Representative Offices in Seoul, and some countries maintain consulates (not including honorary consulates) in cities other than Seoul as well. Several other countries that have diplomatic ties with South Korea but do not operate embassies in Seoul maintain non-resident embassies, mostly in Tokyo, Beijing or elsewhere.

Embassies in Seoul

Embassies To Open

Representative Offices in Seoul
 (Delegation of the European Commission)
 (Taipei Mission in Korea)
 (Hong Kong Economic and Trade Office's Consultant Office in Seoul)
 (Luxembourg Trade and Investment Office)
 (Quebec Government Office)

Consulates General/Consulates

Busan
 (Consulate-General)
 (Consulate-General)
 (Consulate-General)
 (Consulate)
 (Consulate-General)
 (Taipei Mission in Busan)
 (Consulate)

Gwangju
 (Consulate-General)

Jeju
 (Consulate-General)
 (Consulate-General)

Non-resident embassies
Resident in Tokyo, Japan:

 

 
 

 

 

Resident in Beijing, China:

 

 

 
 

Other Resident Cities

 (Dhaka)
 (Bangui)
 (Kuala Lumpur)
 (Washington, D.C.)
 (New York City)
 (Suva)
 (Washington, D.C.)
 (Basseterre)
 (São Tomé)
 (Suva)

Former Embassies

Former Non-resident Representative Offices

Kaesong
  (Inter-Korean Liaison Office) (2018-2020)

See also
Foreign relations of South Korea
List of diplomatic missions of South Korea

References

External links
 Korean Ministry of Foreign Affairs

 
Diplomatic
Korea, South

Diplomatic missions